Chris Evert was the defending champion but lost in the final 3–6, 6–1, 6–4 against Monica Seles.

Seeds
A champion seed is indicated in bold text while text in italics indicates the round in which that seed was eliminated.

  Chris Evert (final)
  Zina Garrison (second round)
  Katerina Maleeva (first round)
  Lori McNeil (quarterfinals)
  Susan Sloane (semifinals)
  Amy Frazier (second round)
  Isabel Cueto (first round)
  Gretchen Magers (quarterfinals)

Draw

External links
 1989 Virginia Slims of Houston Draw

Virginia Slims of Houston
1989 WTA Tour
Virginia Slims of Houston